Gav Koli (also Romanized as Gāv Kolī; also known as Gāvgolī) is a village in Otaqvar Rural District, Otaqvar District, Langarud County, Gilan Province, Iran. At the 2006 census, its population was 35, in 8 families.

References 

Populated places in Langarud County